Plan Ávila is a military contingency plan by the Venezuelan Army to maintain public order in the Venezuelan capital, Caracas.

History

Caracazo

Plan Ávila was first implemented in 1989 by the government of Carlos Andrés Pérez, in response to riots, in an event which became known as the Caracazo; hundreds were killed by military and armed police. On 27 August 2002, the Inter-American Court of Human Rights found that the 1989 implementation of Plan Ávila had resulted in massive human rights violations, and ordered the Venezuelan government to review its military contingency planning to conform to international human rights standards.

2002 Venezuelan coup attempt

The activation of Plan Ávila was ordered by then-President Hugo Chávez at midday on 11 April 2002, in response to public order events leading up to the 2002 Venezuelan coup d'état attempt. The action was in violation of laws in the 1999 Venezuela Constitution created by Chávez that were in place to prevent another massacre like the Caracazo. High-ranking members of the Armed Forces refused to carry out the Plan. When the General responsible was nowhere to be found, another general, Jorge García Carneiro, the head of the largest military unit in Caracas, offered to step in. However, this was thwarted by soldiers blocking a highway and diverting civilian traffic into the military base at Fuerte Tiuna, preventing its troops from leaving. On contacting the base, the general was also told that a group of generals had plans to arrest the President. General in Chief Lucas Rincón and National Assembly President William Lara said that Chávez's order was not to repress the population but to maintain public order.

References

2002 in Venezuela
Military of Venezuela
Political repression in Venezuela